Ulisses Wilson Jeronymo Rocha (born 28 September 1999), commonly known as Ulisses, is a Brazilian footballer who plays for Vasco da Gama as a centre back.

Career statistics

Club

References

1999 births
Living people
Brazilian footballers
Association football defenders
Campeonato Brasileiro Série B players
CR Vasco da Gama players
Footballers from São Paulo